Stanisław Wierzbicki (13 May 1959 – 10 December 2018) was a Polish rower. He competed in the men's quadruple sculls event at the 1980 Summer Olympics.

References

External links
 

1959 births
2018 deaths
Polish male rowers
Olympic rowers of Poland
Rowers at the 1980 Summer Olympics
People from Płock County